The XPeng G3 is a battery-powered crossover SUV produced by the Chinese electric car company XPeng. It was the first mass produced vehicle by XPeng as production commenced November 2018.

Originally revealed as the XPeng Beta during prototype phase in 2016, the name was changed for the limited run first batch edition to XPeng Identy X in 2017.

After almost three years for sale, on 9 July 2021, the manufacturer introduced the updated facelift version of the model with the name of XPeng G3i. It features a front light bar like its counterparts P5, P7, and G9. First units scheduled to be delivered throughout the month of September 2021.

History

The XPeng G3 mass production version was unveiled during the January 2018 Consumer Electronics Show in Las Vegas. According to XPeng Motors, G3 stood for Geek3, and that the name was chosen after a crowd-sourced naming contest. The XPeng G3 is actually the second batch production car, also known as the XPeng 2.0. The XPeng 1.0 was the limited run first-edition pre-production run of 15 cars reserved for founders and investors called the XPeng Identy X revealed in 2017.

The electric motor was planned to be  and is located over the front axle. 
, the XPeng G3's list price ranged from 149,800 to 199,800 yuan.

XPeng started exporting the G3 to Norway in 2020.

XPeng G3i
The XPeng G3i is the mid-cycle facelift unveiled in 2021, featuring a new fascia for the exterior design in the same style as the P7 sedan. The G3i is equipped with the updated intelligent in-car operating system (Xmart OS) and the autonomous driving assistance systems XPILOT 2.5.

XPeng Identy X

The battery cell type of the XPeng Identy X is a Samsung 18650 with an energy density of 152 Wh/kg.

The motor of the XPeng Identy X is made by Jin-Jing Electric, a Beijing-based company. The Identy X is front-wheel drive, with the battery pack located in the floor. The later revealed 4WD version which has a second smaller motor sitting over the rear axle.

References

External links

All-wheel-drive vehicles
Cars introduced in 2018
Compact sport utility vehicles
Crossover sport utility vehicles
Front-wheel-drive vehicles
Production electric cars
G3